Colonel Omar Van Leuven Sage (December 17, 1834 – January 7, 1916) was the Warden of Sing Sing from 1894 to 1899.

Biography
He was born in Prattsville, New York to Hart C. Sage and Clarissa H. Van Leuven. He married Julia Frances Houghtaling on February 15, 1868.

He was a member of the New York State Assembly (Greene Co.) in 1890 and 1891. He was county clerk for Greene County, New York. He was Warden of Sing Sing from 1894 to 1899. He later became Superintendent of the New York House of Refuge on Randall's Island.

He died in Catskill, New York on January 7, 1916.

Legacy
His widow died in 1935.

References

Wardens of Sing Sing
1834 births
1916 deaths
People from Greene County, New York
Democratic Party members of the New York State Assembly
19th-century American politicians